Leclercera is a genus of spiders in the family Psilodercidae found in Asia, including Thailand, Nepal, China and the Philippines. It was first described in 1995 by Christa L. Deeleman-Reinhold, who named it after a fellow collector of Asian spiders. She originally placed under Ochyroceratidae, but it was later moved it to Psilodercidae. It is named for Philippe Leclerc, a collector of spiders in southeast Asia.

Members of this genus are usually larger than those in Psiloderces and Merizocera, but can also be distinguished by teeth on the retromargin of the chelicerae (behind the fang), a round maxillae, and a longer labium. They can be distinguished from Althepus by the rounded posterior margin of the carapace and a shallow fovea that doesn't quite reach the posterior thoracic margin, among other factors.

Species
, it contains forty-three species from Asia:

 Leclercera aniensis Chang & Li, 2020 — China
 Leclercera banensis Chang & Li, 2020 — Thailand
 Leclercera duandai Chang & Li, 2020 — China
 Leclercera duibaensis Chang & Li, 2020 — China
 Leclercera dumuzhou Chang & Li, 2020 — Thailand
 Leclercera ekteenensis Chang & Li, 2020 — Nepal
 Leclercera hponensis Chang & Li, 2020 — Myanmar
 Leclercera jianzuiyu Chang & Li, 2020 — Thailand
 Leclercera jiazhongensis Chang & Li, 2020 — China
 Leclercera khaoyai Deeleman-Reinhold, 1995 (type) — Thailand
 Leclercera lizi Chang & Li, 2020 — China
 Leclercera longiventris Deeleman-Reinhold, 1995 — Thailand
 Leclercera machadoi (Brignoli, 1973) — Nepal
 Leclercera maochong Chang & Li, 2020 — China
 Leclercera mianqiu Chang & Li, 2020 — Indonesia (Sulawesi)
 Leclercera mulcata (Brignoli, 1973) — Nepal
 Leclercera nagarjunensis F. Y. Li & S. Q. Li, 2018 — Nepal
 Leclercera negros Deeleman-Reinhold, 1995 — Philippines
 Leclercera niuqu F. Y. Li & S. Q. Li, 2018 — Nepal
 Leclercera ocellata Deeleman-Reinhold, 1995 — Borneo
 Leclercera paiensis Chang & Li, 2020 — China
 Leclercera pulongensis Chang & Li, 2020 — China
 Leclercera renqinensis Chang & Li, 2020 — China
 Leclercera sanjiao Chang & Li, 2020 — China
 Leclercera selasihensis Chang & Li, 2020 — Indonesia (Sumatra)
 Leclercera shanzi Chang & Li, 2020 — China
 Leclercera shergylaensis Chang & Li, 2020 — China
 Leclercera sidai F. Y. Li & S. Q. Li, 2018 — Nepal
 Leclercera spinata Deeleman-Reinhold, 1995 — Indonesia (Sulawesi)
 Leclercera suwanensis Chang & Li, 2020 — Thailand
 Leclercera thamkaewensis Chang & Li, 2020 — Thailand
 Leclercera thamsangensis Chang & Li, 2020 — Thailand
 Leclercera tudao Chang & Li, 2020 — China
 Leclercera undulata Wang & Li, 2013 — China
 Leclercera xiangbabang Chang & Li, 2020 — Thailand
 Leclercera xiaodai Chang & Li, 2020 — China
 Leclercera yamaensis Chang & Li, 2020 — Thailand
 Leclercera yandou Chang & Li, 2020 — Malaysia (Peninsula)
 Leclercera yanjing Chang & Li, 2020 — China
 Leclercera yuanzhui Chang & Li, 2020 — China
 Leclercera zanggaensis Chang & Li, 2020 — China
 Leclercera zhamensis Chang & Li, 2020 — China
 Leclercera zhaoi F. Y. Li & S. Q. Li, 2018 — Nepal

References

Ochyroceratidae
Araneomorphae genera
Spiders of Asia